In computer networking, source routing, also called path addressing, allows a sender of a packet to partially or completely specify the route the packet takes through the network. In contrast, in conventional routing, routers in the network determine the path incrementally based on the packet's destination. Another routing alternative, label switching, is used in connection-oriented networks such as X.25, Frame Relay, Asynchronous Transfer Mode and Multiprotocol Label Switching.

Source routing allows easier troubleshooting, improved traceroute, and enables a node to discover all the possible routes to a host.  It does not allow a source to directly manage network performance by forcing packets to travel over one path to prevent congestion on another.

Many high-performance interconnects including Myrinet, Quadrics, IEEE 1355, and SpaceWire support source routing.

Internet Protocol
In the Internet Protocol, two header options are available which are rarely used: "strict source and record route" (SSRR) and "loose source and record route" (LSRR). Because of security concerns, packets marked LSRR are frequently blocked on the Internet. If not blocked, LSRR can allow an attacker to spoof an address but still successfully receive response packets by forcing return traffic for spoofed packets to return through the attacker's device.

In IPv6, two forms of source routing have been developed. The first approach was the Type 0 Routing header. This routing header was designed to support the same use cases as the IPv4 header options. Unfortunately there were several significant attacks against this routing header and its utilisation was deprecated. A more secure form of source routing is being developed within the IETF to support the IPv6 version of Segment Routing.

Software-defined networking
Software-defined networking can also be enhanced when source routing is used in the forwarding plane. Studies have shown significant improvements in convergence times as a result of the reduced state that must be distributed by the controller into the network.

Myrinet
When using source routing with Myrinet, the sender of the packet prepends the complete route, one byte for every crossbar, to each packet header.
Each crossbar examines the first routing byte of the packet.
When using source routing, that byte indicates a particular port of that crossbar; when that port becomes available, the router discards that routing byte and sends the rest of the packet out that port.

SpaceWire
Each packet traveling through a SpaceWire network can use path addressing (source routing) or logical addressing or some combination.
The router examines the first data character of the packet; when it indicates some specific port of the router, the router discards that routing character and sends the rest of the packet out that port.

See also 
 Bang path
 Dynamic Source Routing
 Policy-based routing can also be used to route packets using their source addresses.
 Scalable Source Routing

References

External links
 
 Source Routing Not Considered Harmful

Routing algorithms